VVSB (Voetbal Vereniging Sint Bavo) is an amateur association football club from Noordwijkerhout, Netherlands. It currently plays in the Derde Divisie.

History
The club was founded on October 26, 1931 and has played exclusively at the amateur level throughout its history. The club competed in the Hoofdklasse league in the 2009–10 season, finishing in fifth place in the Sunday A group and earning promotion to the newly established Topklasse league for the inaugural 2010–11 season through playoffs.

In 2016, VVSB became the first amateur side to qualify for the KNVB Cup Semifinals in 41 years by knocking out FC Den Bosch.

Current squad 
As of 1 February 2019

References

External links 
 Official site

 
Football clubs in the Netherlands
Football clubs in South Holland
Sport in Noordwijk
Association football clubs established in 1931
1931 establishments in the Netherlands